Damien is an A&E television series based on the horror film series The Omen. The show was ordered as a series on August 25, 2014, by Lifetime, but was moved to A&E on April 29, 2015, where it premiered on March 7, 2016.

On May 20, 2016, A&E cancelled the series after one season.

Synopsis 
Based on the 1976 film The Omen, Damien follows the adult life of Damien Thorn (Bradley James), now a 30-year-old war photographer who has forgotten his Satanic past, facing his true identity. Ann Rutledge (Barbara Hershey), who has protected Damien all his life, will help him embrace his Antichrist side.

Cast

Main cast 
 Bradley James as Damien Thorn 
 Megalyn Echikunwoke as Simone Baptiste
 Omid Abtahi as Amani Golkar
 David Meunier as Detective James Shay
 Barbara Hershey as Ann Rutledge

Recurring cast 
 Scott Wilson as John Lyons
 Gerry Pearson as The Cassocked Man
 Brody Bover as Jacob Shay
 Melanie Scrofano as Veronica Selvaggio
 Sandrine Holt as Paula Sciarra
 Tiffany Hines as Kelly Baptiste

Production 
Flashbacks to Damien's childhood use clips from the original 1976 film The Omen.

The Daggers of Megiddo props were recreated for the production referencing the original 1976 film props for details. They were made by Alan Elliott, a UK-based prop maker.

Episodes

References

External links 
 
 

2016 American television series debuts
2016 American television series endings
A&E (TV network) original programming
2010s American drama television series
2010s American horror television series
English-language television shows
Fictional depictions of the Antichrist
The Omen (franchise)
Television series by 20th Century Fox Television
Television shows filmed in Toronto
Live action television shows based on films
Films about Opus Dei